Châteauguay—Lacolle is a federal electoral district in Quebec. It encompasses a portion of Quebec formerly included in the electoral districts of Beauharnois—Salaberry and Châteauguay—Saint-Constant.

Châteauguay—Lacolle was created by the 2012 federal electoral boundaries redistribution and was legally defined in the 2013 representation order. It came into effect upon the call of the 42nd Canadian federal election, scheduled for 19 October 2015.

Profile
The Liberals are strongest in the more Anglophone city of Châteauguay, while the Bloc garners more support in cities like Mercier, Saint-Rémi, Sainte-Martine and Napierville, as well as the rural portions of the riding.

Members of Parliament
This riding has elected the following Members of Parliament:

Election results

References

Quebec federal electoral districts
Châteauguay
Beauharnois-Salaberry Regional County Municipality
Roussillon Regional County Municipality
Les Jardins-de-Napierville Regional County Municipality